Heterotheca fulcrata, known by the common name rockyscree false goldenaster, is a North American species of flowering plant in the family Asteraceae. It has been found in northern Mexico (Sonora, Chihuahua, Coahuila, Nuevo León, Tamaulipas, Zacatecas) and in the western United States (from Arizona, New Mexico, western Texas north to Wyoming and Idaho).

Varieties
Heterotheca fulcrata var. amplifolia (Rydberg) Semple - Wyoming, Colorado, Arizona, southwestern Utah, southern New Mexico
Heterotheca fulcrata var. arizonica  Semple - from Nevada to Coahuila
Heterotheca fulcrata var. fulcrata - from Wyoming + Idaho south to Arizona and Tamaulipas
Heterotheca fulcrata var. senilis (Wooton & Standley) Semple - southern Arizona, Southern New Mexico, western Texas, Sonora, Chihuahua, Coahuila

References

External links
Photo of herbarium specimen at Missouri Botanical Garden, collected in New Mexico in 1897, isotype of Chrysopsis fulcrata / Heterotheca fulcrata

fulcrata
Flora of North America
Plants described in 1898